Panchlora is a genus of cockroaches, mostly found in South America and Central America. Most species in this genus are green in colour, but some are cream or grey.

This genus contains the following species:

 Panchlora acolhua Saussure & Zehntner 1893
 Panchlora alcarazzas (Serville 1839)
 Panchlora aurora Hebard 1926
 Panchlora azteca Saussure 1862
 Panchlora bidentula Hebard 1916
 Panchlora cahita Hebard 1923
 Panchlora camerunensis Borg 1902
 Panchlora carioca Rocha e Silva 1959
 Panchlora colombiae Hebard 1919
 Panchlora cribrosa Saussure & Zehntner 1893
 Panchlora dumicola Rocha e Silva & Gurney 1962
 Panchlora erronea Saussure 1870
 Panchlora exoleta Burmeister, 1838
 Panchlora festae Giglio-Tos 1898
 Panchlora fraterna Saussure & Zehntner 1893
 Panchlora gracilis Rocha e Silva & Lopes 1977
 Panchlora hebardi Princis 1951
 Panchlora heterocercata Princis 1951
 Panchlora irrorata Hebard 1924
 Panchlora isoldae Lopes & de Oliveira 2000
 Panchlora itabirae Princis 1951
 Panchlora lancadon Saussure 1864
 Panchlora latipennis Saussure and Zehntner, 1893
 Panchlora maracaensis Lopes & de Oliveira 2000
 Panchlora mexicana Saussure 1862
 Panchlora minor Saussure & Zehntner 1893
 Panchlora montezuma Saussure & Zehntner 1893
 Panchlora moxa Saussure 1862
 Panchlora najas Dohrn 1888
 Panchlora nigricornis Walker, F., 1868
 Panchlora nigriventris Shelford 1912
 Panchlora nivea (Linnaeus, 1758)
 Panchlora panchlora Princis 1951
 Panchlora peruana Saussure 1864
 Panchlora petropolitana Rocha e Silva & Lopes 1977
 Panchlora prasina Burmeister 1838
 Panchlora pulchella Burmeister 1838
 Panchlora quadripunctata Stoll 1813
 Panchlora regalis Hebard 1926
 Panchlora sagax Rehn, J. A. G. & Hebard 1927
 Panchlora serrana Rocha e Silva 1959
 Panchlora stanleyana Rehn, J. A. G. 1931
 Panchlora stolata Borg 1902
 Panchlora thalassina Saussure & Zehntner 1893
 Panchlora tolteca Saussure 1873
 Panchlora translucida Kirby, W. F. 1903
 Panchlora viridis (Fabricius 1775)
 Panchlora vosseleri Shelford 1908
 Panchlora zendala Saussure 1862

References 

Cockroach genera